Dinosaur Planet is a four-part American nature documentary that aired on the Discovery Channel as a special-two night event on December 14 and 16, 2003. It is hosted by paleontologist Scott Sampson and narrated by actor Christian Slater. It was released on DVD as a two-disc pack on February 17, 2004, and was also released on VHS around the same time.

The format is similar to Discovery's earlier series When Dinosaurs Roamed America. Each episode tells a fictionalized account of a dinosaur from the Late Cretaceous period. The animals are recreated with computer-generated imagery and composited into present-day filmed locations that approximate prehistoric Earth. Periodic interludes (three in each episode) feature Scott Sampson explaining the scientific findings behind the story, also similar to When Dinosaurs Roamed America, but has improved in quality.

Episodes
{{Episode table |background=#A0D0A0 |overall= |title= |director= |writer= |airdate= |episodes=
{{Episode list
 | EpisodeNumber= 1
 | Title=White Tip's Journey
 | DirectedBy=Pierre de Lespinois
 | WrittenBy =Mike Carroll (story), Michael Ormert and Georgann Kane (narration), Gary Parker (paleontologist segments)
 | OriginalAirDate =  
 | ShortSummary= :

 Setting: Gobi Desert, (Mongolia), 80-70 MYA
 Filming Locations: Oceano Dunes State Vehicular Recreation Area, California
In the vast deserts of Prehistoric Mongolia during the Cretaceous time zone, a lone female Velociraptor, White Tip, is walking across the barren dunes. She once lived with other raptors in a group but another pack of raptors attacked her group and all her fellow pack members were massacred by the rival Velociraptor. Only White Tip escaped alive, and she must find a new group. She tries to hunt a small pachycephalosaurid dinosaur called Prenocephale, but fails, as she cannot efficiently hunt without other raptors to back her up. She then turns to hunt smaller prey such as a lizard.

During one of her hunts, White Tip hears the screams of an Oviraptor flock and heads to the location. When she gets there, the Oviraptor turn out to be in a mating ritual, where a young male tries to seduce the female with his brilliant plumage, but his tactics fail and the female leaves. Then an older male arrives and drives the young bachelor away. Enraged, the Oviraptor then takes his anger out on White Tip, who runs away.

A moment later, White Tip stumbles into a shallow valley of a Protoceratops nest, where she encounters a doe and a buck. She is chased away by the old male ceratopsian guarding his mate and clutch of eggs. Luckily, the bull chases her into the territory of another male Protoceratops, who challenges, and duels the intruder. The old bull is outclassed by the other bull Protoceratops in a head-butting match, and is driven off. The older Protoceratops limps away, bleeding while dazed and disoriented. White Tip finishes the bull off and begins her meal. While she eats, the smell of blood attracts a small pack of other Velociraptor, led by an alpha male, Broken Hand, who had injured one of his arms in an earlier battle. They follow the blood trail to White Tip's kill, and she reluctantly hands her kill over. At first, she makes to continue her lone journey, but stops: White Tip realizes the pack is strong, and tries to joins them. However, the other male in the pack, Blue Brow, shows curiosity first, and, taking it as a sign of an attempt to change authority, Broken Hand suddenly shows aggression towards Blue Brow, knocking White Tip out of the way. After a short argument, a fight ensues with Blue Brow winning, and Broken Hand flees, stunned and disgraced. Blue Brow is the new raptor alpha and allows White Tip to join the pack as his mate.

Later, the pack heads off to hunt for one thing most raptors love eating: nutritional dinosaur eggs. What they find is a Protoceratops herd of seven to eight individuals guarding two nests of eggs. The females lunge forward, snapping and biting to goad the Protoceratops long enough for Blue Brow and White Tip to go in and raid the nests. The Protoceratops focus on defending against the female Velociraptor whilst White Tip and Blue Brow go behind the group, steal several eggs and flee, with the other raptors retreating close behind soon after. However, the loot is divided: Blue Brow keeps his eggs, and White Tip has to give hers away.

Three months later, White Tip has high authority in the pack, and also is soon to be a mother. She later lays her eggs under the shade of several desert trees but because there are predators everywhere, she must stay with her eggs, while the rest of the pack go hunting. The others chase a Shuvuuia, but an Oviraptor suddenly lunges out of the trees and catches it first, ruining the raptors' hunt. Because the pack did not kill any prey, White Tip goes hungry. During the night, she tries to catch a Deltatheridium, but is interrupted by Broken Hand, eating two of her five eggs in his attempt to stay strong. She runs back and scares Broken Hand off.

Soon, White Tip's eggs hatch, and she can go hunting with the others. This time, they make a successful attack on a Oviraptor nest. White Tip gives one of the dead Oviraptor children to her own, and both species of dinosaur infants, strangely, look similar, though it is noted that White Tip's children could have easily been Oviraptor food too. That night, heavy rain pours down across the entire desert. After the rain, the pack goes on the hunt, refusing to help their previous leader, Broken Hand. Broken Hand foolishly tries to attack a Prenocephale herd, but the armored herbivores are working together to beat him up and drive him off. A few days later, the pack discovers Broken Hand's rotting corpse and move on, deciding that he is too putrid to eat. When they do manage to find the Protoceratops herd, the other two female Velociraptors slide down the hill to goad them, while Blue Brow and White Tip go around to attack from behind to trap the ceratopsian dinosaurs.

White Tip makes the first move by pouncing on one and tries to wound it, but gets thrown off and onto the ground by the bucking ceratopsian. Blue Brow takes on another Protoceratops, a strong male, whom he fought before. The male raptor lunges and tries to wrestle his foe to the ground, but his wrist is crushed by the Protoceratops'''s beak but not before Blue Brow buries one of his large foot claws into the dinosaur's stomach. The raptor pulls himself free of the buck's grasp and the dinosaurs prepare to battle again, but the heavy rain from the storm has weakened the dunes above them and as the dune collapses in on itself, a landslide buries Blue Brow and the Protoceratops, along with the two female raptors, while White Tip and the other Protoceratops watch as their fellows die. White Tip, once again, is left without a pack, but this time, she returns to her offspring, and raises her young as new additions to form her own pack. Later on, Blue Brow and the Protoceratops he died with, will become the famous Fighting Dinosaurs fossil.
|LineColor       = A0D0A0
}}

{{Episode list
 | EpisodeNumber= 3
 | Title= Alpha's Egg
 | DirectedBy=Pierre de Lespinois
 | WrittenBy =Mike Carroll (story), Michael Ormert and Georgann Kane (narration), Gary Parker (paleontologist segments)
 | OriginalAirDate =  
 | ShortSummary= :

 Setting: the forests of Patagonia in South America, 80 MYA.
 Filming Locations: Kings Canyon National Park, California; and Sequoia National Forest, California.

The episode starts with a herd of Saltasaurus, all of them female, heading for their nesting grounds. Alpha, a young heifer, is making the trip for the first time since she was born. The narrator explains that their only protection is their numbers and size. Saltasaurus are not the only dinosaurs in the area, however: Aucasaurus lurk in the forests. Dragonfly, a teenage male, and his mate have been drawn by a corpse of a dead saltasaur. Knowing that no one is around, they walk and eat. However, a pair of carcharodontosaurs appear from the shadows and ruin their lunch, much to Dragonfly's dismay.

The nesting ground is a large flat river plain, larger than 3 football fields. Although Alpha needs to find a spot to lay her eggs, she's not the first to arrive, since the older females are veterans of building nests. Alpha builds a nest and lays her eggs for the first time. Then she and the herd head back to the forest to collect bushy leaves to incubate their eggs.

The program jumps back in time 15 years to the same ground, showing how Alpha's own story began.

Approaching the hatching period, the nesting ground is still guarded by a couple of female Saltasaurus, keeping some potential plunderers off the nests. One of these, an Alvarezsaurus, pecks at an egg while pushing Alpha's away. However, a crocodile, Notosuchus, scares the plunderer off, and pokes a hole in Alpha's egg, only to be fended off by an adult Saltasaurus. Alpha is the first of her nest to hatch.

Meanwhile, in the forest, a young Aucasaurus, Dragonfly, is also born. His mother hears some rustling from the bushes, and a male Aucasaurus appears. She bares her teeth and hisses at him. The male is her mate, and he soothes her by inflating his throat pouch. While the female takes a nap, her babies have some fun. Dragonfly, the oldest, is goofing off with a dragonfly. He tries to grab it, but misses. Dragonfly will become the main enemy to Alpha.

That night, all the baby Saltasaurus have hatched, and they rush for the safety of the forest, dodging Alvarezsaurus and Notosuchus. Dozens of Saltasaurus calves are slain and devoured while they make a run for their lives. That morning, Alpha comes face to face with a hungry Notosuchus, but just in time, an adult Saltasaurus scares it away. Alpha and her fellow youngsters travel along with the adult Saltasaurus herd.

Moments later, the herd stops to browse on the treetops. At one point, they are interrupted by the same family of Aucasaurus. The male and his mate are teaching Dragonfly and his sisters how to hunt. They confront the adult Saltasaurus, but Dragonfly alerts his mother to one of the groups of Saltasaurus calves that split up in alarm. She turns her head, spots them and directs their assault on the calves, devouring five of them. As the adult Aucasaurs and the young females pass by, Alpha comes face to face with Dragonfly. Luckily, a dragonfly flies by and Dragonfly starts to chase it, and Alpha survives.

As Alpha enters adolescence, she meets Dragonfly again, this time in the wildlands. While Alpha and her herd head for a forest to eat, Dragonfly and his family are right behind them. Dragonfly eagerly darts towards Alpha. She startles him with a bellowing growl, and he jumps away. The Aucasaurus pack trots ahead. As Alpha browses from a tree, another female Saltasaurus comes forward and angrily shoves her aside to eat the leaves, but stumbles on a log, and tumbles down a hill, breaking bones. Alerted by the injured females's screams of pain, the Aucasaurus pack heads over to her and kills the wounded animal, with one Aucasaurus piercing the Saltasaurus jugular. As they eat, Dragonfly slams his thigh into one of his sisters, but his father scolds him for this action and his rude behavior. The pack continues to eat. A while later, Dragonfly wakes up from a good nap, gets to his feet and heads off to look for a mate to start a pack with, since he knows that as long as he stays, he'll end up being scolded by his father.

Sometime later, the mating season ensues, and Alpha is in heat. One young bull attempts to try his luck, but the older bull, who is the leader of the herd, challenges him to a duel: this involves shouting, followed by necking (like modern giraffes) and headbutting. The younger bull wins the duel and mates with Alpha. After the mating season ends, the herd heads toward the grasslands. On the way, Alpha, watching a stalking Dragonfly rather than the ground in front of her, nearly trips on a log and sprains her wrist. Soon after, Dragonfly finds a female Aucasaurus around his age and attempts to seduce her by inflating his throat pouch, but she at first refuses. However, his persistence and inflating of his throat pouch finally win her heart, and they become mates. Meanwhile, the herd passes through the grasslands, but watching them from the shadows are a pair of carcharodontosaurs. In spite of her sprained wrist, Alpha manages to outpace a sick, older female, who is mauled and devoured by the carcharodontosaurs.

Soon, the herd reaches the nesting ground where the story began, and lay their eggs. But, after their nests are complete, a thunderstorm brews over the plain, and the nesting ground is in ruins. Following the deluge, the unborn Saltasaurus babies drown.

Later, as Alpha looks for a spot to eat, she senses Dragonfly and his mate nearby and readies herself for a duel with them. Dragonfly bares his teeth and goes for an attack. Alpha headbutts him, whips the female Aucasaurus with her tail, knocking the Aucasaurus off her feet and rendering her unable to get up, and then rams Dragonfly, disorienting him for a short time. He wakes up from his disorientation and clamps his jaws on Alpha's left shoulder, but Alpha loses her balance and falls, crushing Dragonfly's skull under her weight, killing him. Alpha then rises to her feet, stares at Dragonfly's lifeless corpse and leaves victorious. The Aucasaur female rises to her feet, having just witnessed the whole thing, and tries to wake Dragonfly up. To her horror, her attempts to awaken Dragonfly fail miserably, and this causes her to throw her head back and let loose a loud, mournful howl.

Alpha returns to her herd, and soon makes a full recovery despite her injury. The program ends on a happy note for Alpha, claiming that she will have hundreds of offspring during her hundred-year lifetime.
|LineColor       = A0D0A0
}}

}}

Marketing
There were a couple of different websites for the series that were created back in November 2003, which included promos on the central characters of each of the episodes, and showed animations of them in a white background. The site appeared to have some of its format taken away by June 2006, but the link remained intact on the site until December 2008, when the link finally redirected to the dinosaur section of Discovery's website, and about five years after the show originally premiered. An interactive game was also created, showcasing the dinosaurs in the show, where they are located, and other facts about them.

Reception
The series was recommended by DVD Talk.

AwardsPrimetime Emmy Awards'2004 – Outstanding Sound Editing for Nonfiction Programming (Single or Multi-Camera) - Patrick Cusack, David Esparza, Sean Rowe, Lisa Varetakis, Michael Payne, Dean Grinsfelder, Stephen P. Robinson, Nancy Nugent and Gregg Barbanell
2004 – Outstanding Sound Mixing for Nonfiction Programming (Single or Multi-Camera)'' - Mike Olman and Ken Kobett

References

External links
 (now a 404 error)
Dinosaur Interactive Viewer (now a 404 error)

Discovery Channel original programming
Documentary television series about dinosaurs
2003 American television series debuts
2003 American television series endings